Eightball is a comic book by Daniel Clowes and published by Fantagraphics Books.  It ran from 1989 to 2004.  The first issue appeared soon after the end of Clowes's previous comic book, Lloyd Llewellyn.  Eightball has been among the best-selling series in alternative comics.

Early issues of Eightball feature a mixture of very short, often crudely humorous comics ("Zubrick and Pogeybait", "The Sensual Santa"), topical rants and satires ("Art School Confidential", "On Sports"), longer, more reflective self-contained stories ("Caricature", "Immortal Invisible"), and serialized works. The first extended story serialized in Eightball was Like a Velvet Glove Cast in Iron, which ran in issues #1–10. Glove was followed by Ghost World (issues #11–18). Beginning with #19 each issue of Eightball has been devoted to a single storyline, as opposed to the more eclectic format of the earlier issues. Issues #19–21 serialized the graphic novel David Boring, while issues #22 and 23 each consisted of a collection of short, fragmentary stories in diverse styles and formats that meshed into a unified narrative ("Ice Haven" and "The Death Ray"). The issues of Eightball beginning with #19 have been published in full color in a larger magazine-sized format.  Eightball #18 included a bound-in copy of Clowes's pamphlet Modern Cartoonist.

Single issues

Book collections
 Lout Rampage! (Fantagraphics, 1991) – Short stories
 Like a Velvet Glove Cast in Iron (Fantagraphics, 1993) – Graphic novel
 Pussey!: The Complete Saga of Young Dan Pussey (Fantagraphics, 1995) – Stories featuring Clowes' character Dan Pussey
 Orgy Bound (Fantagraphics, 1996) – Short stories
 Ghost World (Fantagraphics, 1997) – Graphic novel
 Caricature (Fantagraphics, 1998) – Short stories
 David Boring (Pantheon Books, 2000) – Graphic novel
 Twentieth Century Eightball (Fantagraphics, 2002) – Short stories
 Ice Haven (Pantheon, 2005) – A reformatted version of the contents of Eightball #22
 The Complete Eightball 1–18 (Fantagraphics, 2015)

Film adaptations
Ghost World was adapted by Clowes and director Terry Zwigoff into a 2001 feature film of the same name, for which Clowes and Zwigoff were nominated for an Academy Award for screenplay writing. Additionally, the 2006 Clowes/Zwigoff film Art School Confidential was loosely based on a short story of the same name which appeared in Eightball #7.

Controversy
The comic generated controversy when a high school teacher in Guilford, Connecticut gave Eightball #22 (Ice Haven) to a student as a make-up summer reading assignment. The parents of the student had concerns about the book's appropriateness. The superintendent of Guilford High School said the book was inappropriate for 13-year-olds and placed the teacher on leave. The teacher resigned before the matter was fully investigated. The Guilford school district and principal were criticized for getting police involved and trying the issue in a "kangaroo court".

References

External links
 
 
 List of all issues of Eightball and their contents
 Eightball at Fantagraphics - Order and preview Eightball comic books and merchandise from the publisher

Comics by Daniel Clowes
Humor comics
Satirical comics
Fantagraphics titles
1989 comics debuts
2004 comics endings
Eisner Award winners
Harvey Award winners for Best New Series
Harvey Award winners for Best Continuing or Limited Series
Harvey Award winners for Best Single Issue or Story
Comics anthologies